Kickboxing was among the sports contested at the 2021 Southeast Asian Games. There were twelve events in kickboxing held from 8 to 13 May 2022 at Bắc Ninh Multi-purpose Stadium in Bắc Ninh, Vietnam.

Participating nations

 (host)

Medal table

Medalists

Full contact

Low kick

Results

Full contact 
Men's 51 kg

Men's 57 kg

Men's 67 kg

Women's 48 kg

Women's 56 kg

Women's 65kg

Low kick 
Men's 54 kg

Men's 60 kg

Men's 63.5 kg

Men's 71 kg

Women's 52 kg

Women's 60 kg

References

External links
 

2021 Southeast Asian Games events
Southeast Asian Games